"Older" is a 1997 song by English singer-songwriter George Michael, released as the fourth single from his third album, Older (1996). It was also released as an EP under the name The Older EP. The single's B-side is a cover of Bonnie Raitt's song "I Can't Make You Love Me". The single peaked at number three on the UK Singles Chart while becoming a top-ten hit in Denmark, Hungary, Ireland, and Spain.

Critical reception
Scottish newspaper Aberdeen Press and Journal stated that Michael follows up a triumphant 1996 with "one of his strongest ballads to date". They also said it is a track "he obviously hopes will cement his maturing image." Sarah Davis from Dotmusic noted the "jazzy mood", "as Michael brusquely casts off a former lover - "I'm not the man you want... these are wasted days without affection, I'm not that foolish anymore" - to the quavering accompaniment of Steve Sidwell's trumpet." Elysa Gardner from Los Angeles Times called it "moody", noting that the singer is "addressing a lover" in the song. 

A reviewer from Music Week rated it five out of five, writing, "As smooth, soulful and jazzy a ballad as Michael has ever made, this silky song is coupled with the Bonnie Raitt track I Can't Make You Love Me. A certain hit." Steve Morse from The Spokesman-Review described it as a "anguished love song". Ed Morales for Vibe wrote in his album review, that on the "affecting" title track, "Michael delivers his message of aging gracefully through a narrative detailing a breakup—one lover is crowding another. "Change is a stranger you have to know", he says."

Music video

The official music video for the song was directed by British director Andy Morahan. It was later published on Michael's official YouTube channel in September 2010. The video has amassed more than 6,7 million views as of October 2021.

Track listings
 Standard CD EP
 "Older" – 5:35
 "I Can't Make You Love Me" – 5:21
 "Desafinado" (with Astrud Gilberto) – 3:22
 "The Strangest Thing" (live) – 6:01

 UK cassette EP
 "Older" (radio edit) – 5:00
 "I Can't Make You Love Me" – 5:21
 "Desafinado" (with Astrud Gilberto) – 3:22
 "The Strangest Thing" (live) – 5:01

 European CD single
 "Older" – 5:35
 "I Can't Make You Love Me" – 5:21

Charts

Weekly charts

Year-end charts

Certifications

References

1997 songs
1997 singles
DreamWorks Records singles
George Michael songs
Music videos directed by Andy Morahan
Pop ballads
Song recordings produced by George Michael
Songs written by George Michael
Virgin Records singles